Richard Allen Peterson (February 26, 1923 – June 4, 2000) was a fighter ace and a major in the United States Army Air Forces.

Early life and education
Peterson was born in Hancock, Minnesota and attended the University of Minnesota. He left the university in June 1942 to become an aviation cadet.

World War II
After finishing flight training in March 1943, Peterson was assigned to the 357th Fighter Group and had 15.5 air victories and destroyed 3.5 aircraft on the ground. His P-51 Mustang aircraft were named Hurry Home Honey after his wife's letter closing. He is also known for forcing a German pilot to bail out of his aircraft, then shooting him in his parachute. According to Peterson, he did this in retaliation after witnessing that same pilot deliberately shooting American airmen in their parachutes.

Post war
After World War II, Peterson returned to the University of Minnesota and obtained a degree in Architecture which became his career.

Awards and decorations
Peterson was awarded the Silver Star, Distinguished Flying Cross with 3 oak leaf clusters, and Air Medal with 10 oak leaf clusters.

See also
Chuck Yeager
Bud Anderson
Leonard K. Carson
John B. England
Minnesota Aviation Hall of Fame

References

External links

1923 births
2000 deaths
American World War II flying aces
Aviators from Minnesota
Recipients of the Silver Star
Recipients of the Distinguished Flying Cross (United States)
Recipients of the Air Medal
United States Army Air Forces officers
United States Army Air Forces pilots of World War II